Baragaon is a village in Nalanda District of Bihar state, India. It is known for its Chhath Puja celebrations, performed at a large pond in the village and attended by people from across northern Bihar. There is a big ancient temple of God Surya (Sun temple).

References

Villages in Nalanda district